The Man Who Fights Alone is a 1924 American silent drama film produced by Famous Players-Lasky and distributed by Paramount Pictures. It was directed by Wallace Worsley and starred William Farnum and Lois Wilson.

Cast

Preservation
With no copies of The Man Who Fights Alone located in any film archives it is a lost film.

References

External links

Lobby card

1924 films
American silent feature films
Lost American films
Films based on short fiction
Famous Players-Lasky films
Films directed by Wallace Worsley
1924 drama films
Silent American drama films
American black-and-white films
Films about paraplegics or quadriplegics
1920s American films